Zaremba  is a surname of Polish-language origin. Derived from the verb zarąbać ("to chop"), it may be an occupational name for a woodcutter or a habitational name from places such as Zaręby. It may refer to:

 Coat of arms of Zaremba
 Andrzej Zaremba (died 1317 or 1318), Bishop of Poznań, 14th century
 John Zaremba (1908–1986), American actor
 Mateusz Zaremba (born 1984), Polish handballer
 Nikolai Zaremba (1821–1879), Russian composer and teacher
 Ota Zaremba (born 1957), Czech weightlifter
 Peter Zaremba (1908–1994), American hammer thrower
 Peter Zaremba, member of The Fleshtones
 Stanisław Zaremba (1863–1942), Polish mathematician
 Thomas II Zaremba Bishop of Wrocław, 13th century

References

See also
 
 Zaręba
 Zarębów
 Zarębki

Polish-language surnames